Liberty Skis Corporation is one of the ski industry's largest independent ski manufacturers, and a leader in the manufacture of carving, touring, powder, and twin-tip skis, used primarily for a style of skiing known alternately as newschool skiing or freeskiing. Founded in 2003 by James Satloff and Dan Chalfant, Liberty Skis has grown to be one of the largest independent ski manufacturers worldwide, with shops and distributors in the US, Canada, Europe, and Asia.

Liberty Skis Corporation is based in Avon, Colorado.

Additional information

The corporation has sponsored a wide range of events on and off snow in the US and Canada including the Vail International Pondskimming Championships and Spring Back to Vail

The company's ski team has included skiers such as Olympics finalist, Teal Harle, X-Games medalist Phil Larose, Phil Bélanger, Ryan Moore, Anton Sponar, Rich Fahey, Kyler Cooley, and Joe Schuster from North America and New Zealand women's national freeskiing champion, Pip Simmonds

Liberty is a sponsor of many events and resorts across North America.

Notes

Sporting goods manufacturers of the United States
Companies based in Colorado
Eagle County, Colorado
Ski equipment manufacturers
Manufacturing companies based in Colorado
American companies established in 2003
Manufacturing companies established in 2003
2003 establishments in Colorado